Sai Wan Shan (Chinese: 西灣山) is a hill in northern Hong Kong Island. The hill is the site of former military installations used by the British Colonial administration. Now, the installations have been turned into a leisure facility called Lei Yue Mun Park and Holiday Village.

See also 

 List of mountains, peaks and hills in Hong Kong
 Chai Wan

References 

Mountains, peaks and hills of Hong Kong
Eastern District, Hong Kong